This list of marginocephalian type specimens is a list of fossils serving as the official standard-bearers for inclusion in the species and genera of the dinosaur clade Marginocephalia, which includes the thick-headed pachycephalosaurs and the horned ceratopsians. Type specimens are those which are definitionally members of biological taxa and additional specimens can only be "referred" to these taxa if an expert deems them sufficiently similar to the type.

The list

See also
List of ornithopod type specimens
List of Mesozoic theropod type specimens
List of thyreophoran type specimens
List of other ornithischian type specimens

Lists of dinosaur specimens
Mesozoic fossil record